Mukti Taroka (Bengali: মুক্তি তারকা), is a military medal of Bangladesh. The medal was established on December 15, 1973. The medal is intended for awarding participants in the War of Independence. The Bangladesh War of Independence was an armed conflict between West Pakistan, East Pakistan (i.e., between Pakistan and Bangladesh, which were at that time two parts of the same country) and India, as a result of which East Pakistan became the independent country of Bangladesh.

References 

Military awards and decorations of Bangladesh
1970s awards in Bangladesh